was a lieutenant general in the Japanese Imperial Army during World War II.

Early life and education
Inada was born in Tottori Prefecture in August 1896. He graduated from the 29th class of the Imperial Japanese Army Academy in 1917, where he specialized in artillery. He went on to graduate from the 37th class of the Army Staff College with honors in 1925.

Career
After serving in a number of administrative positions with the Imperial Japanese Army General Staff, Inada was assigned as a military attaché to France from 1929-1931.  After his promotion to colonel, Inada served as Chief of the 2nd Section (Maneuvers & War Plans), 1st Bureau, of the General Staff from 1938 to 1939, and was thus involved in the planning of the Battle of Wuhan and subsequent operations in the Second Sino-Japanese War. Inada was also involved in the planning for the ill-fated Battle of Lake Khasan and Battle of Khalkhin Gol in the Soviet-Japanese Border Wars.  

From 1940 Inada was commanding officer of a heavy artillery regiment based in Acheng in northern Manchukuo. In 1941 he became Vice Chief of Staff of the 5th Army in Manchukuo. He was promoted to major general in 1941, and became Chief of Staff of the 5th Army from 1942.

Inada was then sent as Vice Chief of Staff of the Southern Expeditionary Army Group in the Pacific Theater from 1942 to 1943.  To support Japanese forces in New Guinea he was sent in 1943 to command of the 2nd Field Operations Base Area. In 1944 he became commander of the 6th Air Division. Later that year, due to a diplomatic incident in Thailand, he was placed in reserve, then reassigned as commander of the 3rd Shipping Transport Command, based in Singapore. Promoted to lieutenant general in April 1945, Inada was Chief of Staff of the 16th Area Army until the surrender of Japan.

Later life and death
After the end of the war, Inada was arrested by the American occupation authorities and tried before a military tribunal held in Yokohama for war crimes. He was found guilty of permitting atrocities against prisoners of war in the Fukuoka area during the war, and sentenced to seven years in prison in April 1946. He was released in 1951, and died in 1986.

References

Books

External links

Notes

1896 births
1986 deaths
Military personnel from Tottori Prefecture
Imperial Japanese Army generals of World War II
Japanese people convicted of war crimes
Prisoners and detainees of the United States military